Richard Eric Peter Wigglesworth (born 9 June 1983) is an English rugby union coach and former player for Leicester Tigers in Premiership Rugby. He is the record appearance maker for Premiership Rugby having also played for Sale Sharks and Saracens. He has won Seven Premiership titles, one with Sale, five with Saracens, and one with Leicester as well as three European Rugby Champions Cups with Saracens. In his career he has played over 400 club games

Born in Blackpool, England, he attended Kirkham Grammar School. Wigglesworth's position of choice is as a scrum-half, and he can also operate as a fly-half or as a winger.

Club career
Wigglesworth started his professional career with Sale Sharks coming through the youth ranks, and starting the 2005–06 Premiership final. In June 2010, Wigglesworth moved to Saracens. During his time at Saracens he won five further Premiership titles in 2011, 2015, 2016, 2018 and 2019, with Wigglesworth featuring in all five finals. He also helped Saracens win the European Champions Cup in 2016, 2017 and 2019. He left Saracens at the conclusion of the 2019–20 season.

On 6 November 2020 Wigglesworth joined Leicester Tigers for the 2020-21 Premiership Rugby season. Wigglesworth was the first player to appear in 300 Premiership matches on 5 June 2021 when he came on as a replacement in the second half of the match against Bristol. He started the 2022 Premiership Rugby final as Tigers beat his former club Saracens 15-12, with Wigglesworth winning his seventh title.

Coaching career
Wigglesworth joined the coaching team at Ealing Trailfinders in 2019 as Attack Coach, combining this part time role with his playing commitments at Saracens. Following his transfer to Leicester Tigers in November 2020. Ahead of the 2021–22 season, he took up the Attack Coach role in addition to remaining as an active and key player in the premiership winning squad. 

With the release of both Steve Borthwick and Kevin Sinfield from Leicester he was promoted to interim head coach and immediately retired as a player.

In the early 2000s, while being a professional player, Wigglesworth was part of the coaching team at amateur club Ormskirk RUFC, sharing his tactical knowledge and his experiences with the youth teams.

International career
Wigglesworth was called up to the England squad for the 2008 Six Nations Championship. He was selected for the England Saxons and the training squad for the 2007 Rugby World Cup.

Wigglesworth was named in the starting line-up for England in the 2008 RBS Six Nations Championship match against France in Paris. Sale coach Philippe Saint-Andre said he is confident that England newcomer Wigglesworth has the mentality required for international rugby. On 23 February 2008, he scored a 79th minute try to help England to a 24–13 win in Paris.

Wigglesworth served as the defence and kicking coach of Canada at the 2019 Rugby World Cup.

Honours

Sale Sharks 
 Premiership Rugby: 2005-06
European Challenge Cup: 2004–05

Saracens
 Premiership Rugby: 2010–11, 2014–15, 2015–16, 2017–18, 2018–19
 European Rugby Champions Cup: 2015–16, 2016–17, 2018–19
Anglo-Welsh Cup: 2014–15

Leicester Tigers
 Premiership Rugby: 2021–22

England
 Calcutta Cup: 2015
 Millennium Trophy: 2008

Personal life

Wigglesworth married Lindsay Jane Fitzgerald in July 2009 and they now have two daughters, Matilda and Margot and a son, Freddie. Lindsay is a qualified dentist and graduated from Liverpool University's BDS course in 2007.

International tries

References

External links
Sale profile
England profile
England new boys – Richard Wigglesworth

1983 births
Living people
Rugby union scrum-halves
England international rugby union players
English rugby union players
Sale Sharks players
Saracens F.C. players
People educated at Kirkham Grammar School
Leicester Tigers players
Leicester Tigers coaches
Rugby union players from Blackpool